Doug Specht (born February 7, 1942) was a Canadian football player who played for the Ottawa Rough Riders. He won the Grey Cup in 1968 and 1969. Specht was voted Eastern Conference All-Star in 1966. He previously played college football at Brigham Young University on a football scholarship. In 2006, Specht was inducted into the Windsor-Essex County Sports Hall of Fame. He has remained an Ottawa resident since his playing career and is a long time respected Bailiff in the region.

References

1942 births
Ottawa Rough Riders players
Living people
Canadian football offensive linemen
Sportspeople from Windsor, Ontario
Players of Canadian football from Ontario
BYU Cougars football players
Canadian players of American football